99.9 FM is a 2005 Indian film directed by Sanjay Bhatia and produced under the banners of 2 Gram Films and P.R Films. The film stars Shawar Ali, Raima Sen and Dipannita Sharma in lead roles. The film follows the plot of a radio jockey (Shawar), despite being married, gets entangled in a love triangle with an air-hostess.

Plot
Gautam Singh (Shawar Ali) meets Sonali (Dipannita Sharma) an air-hostess and gradually he develops feelings for her. However Sonali breaks up with Gautam, leaving him distressed and heart-broken. However, he meets Kim (Raima Sen) and marries her. Gautam is a radio jockey at a radio station named "99.9 FM" based in Mumbai. The couple's lives goes well until Gautam meets Sonali again, re-awakening his love for her. Sonali proposes Gautam to marry her and asks him to divorce Kim. However, a reluctant Gautam has no reason to divorce his wife, which makes Sonali upset and she leaves Gautam. A devastated and helpless Gautam has no other option till the point where he makes up his mind to live with Sonali. He conspires against Kim and kills her with a revolver. Before killing Kim, Gautam had planned to elope with Sonali. But the guilt of killing his wife hurts his conscience and he confesses it to Sonali. Sonali, who was waiting for Gautam, gets broken after the confession made by him. She walks away and Gautam tries to evade the law by escaping from Mumbai and police. However, the police arrest him from the highway and he is sentenced to death for killing his wife. The next night shows Sonali being the new host to the channel in the place of Gautam.

Cast
 Shawar Ali as Gautam Singh
 Raima Sen as Kim Singh
 Dipannita Sharma as Sonali
 Rajkumar Kanojia
 Jaipreet Nagra

Music
"Chori Chor" - Shubha Mudgal
"Gumsum" - Shaan
"Intezaar" - Shubha Mudgal
"Is Paal" - Shubha Mudgal
"Jo Bhaje" - Bhimsen Joshi
"Kate Nahi Raat" - Ustad Sultan Khan
"Sanoon" - Nusrat Fateh Ali Khan
"Tanha Dil" - Shaan

Review
Taran Adarsh from Bollywood Hungama rated the film 1 out of 5 and criticised the film for having a "lifeless script" and stated "99.9 FM is a poor show all the way."

References

External links
 
 99. 9 FM at Bollywood Hungama
 99.9 FM at Rotten Tomatoes

2005 crime drama films
2005 films
Indian musical films
Films shot in Mumbai
Films about infidelity
Films about radio
Films scored by Shantanu Moitra
2000s Hindi-language films